The House of Commons is the name for the elected lower house of the bicameral parliaments of the United Kingdom and Canada. In both of these countries, the Commons holds much more legislative power than the nominally upper house of parliament. The leader of the majority party in the House of Commons by convention becomes the prime minister. Other parliaments have also had a lower house called the "House of Commons".

History and naming

The House of Commons of the Kingdom of England evolved from an undivided parliament to serve as the voice of the tax-paying subjects of the counties and the boroughs. Knights of the shire, elected from each county, were usually landowners, while the borough members were often from the merchant classes. These members represented subjects of the Crown who were not Lords Temporal or Spiritual, who themselves sat in the House of Lords. The House of Commons gained its name because it represented communities (communes). 

Since the 19th century, the British and Canadian Houses of Commons have become increasingly representative, as suffrage has been extended.  Both bodies are now elected via universal adult suffrage. However, from the Middle Ages until the early 20th century the suffrage was limited in various ways, typically to some male property-owners; in 1780 just 3% of the population could vote.

Specific bodies

British Isles

Westminster 
 Kingdom of England: the House of Commons of England (met at the Palace of Westminster, London) sat from 1295 to 1706
 Kingdom of Great Britain: the House of Commons of Great Britain (at the Palace of Westminster) 1707 to 1801
 The House of Commons of the United Kingdom (at the Palace of Westminster) since 1801

Dublin 
 Kingdom of Ireland: House of Commons of Ireland (at various locations in Dublin: Dublin Castle, Bluecoat School, Irish Parliament House) 1297 to 1801
 Southern Ireland: House of Commons of Southern Ireland (at Government Buildings, Dublin) 1921 to 1922

Belfast 
 Northern Ireland: House of Commons of Northern Ireland (at Parliament Buildings (Stormont), Belfast) 1921 to 1972

Canada 
 The House of Commons of Canada on Parliament Hill, in Ottawa, Ontario since 1867

United States 
 The lower house of the General Assembly of North Carolina was also known as the House of Commons between 1760 and 1868, when it was renamed the House of Representatives.

See also
 House of Assembly
 Legislative Assembly
 National Assembly
 Lok Sabha
 House of Representatives
 House of Lords

References

Legislatures
Westminster system